Thiophanate-methyl is an organic compound with the formula C6H4(NHC(S)NH(CO)OCH3)2. The compound is a colorless or white solid, although commercial samples are generally tan-colored.  It is prepared from o-phenylenediamine.

Uses and analysis
It is a widely used fungicide used on tree, vine, and root crops.  In Europe it is applied to tomato, wine grapes, beans, wheat, and aubergine.

Methods for its analysis have received considerable attention. It is commonly used to treat botrytis bunch rot and gray mold caused by Botrytis cinerea strawberry in California.

Fungicidal Action 
Thiophanate-methyl acts as a fungicide via its primary metabolite carbendazim.

References 

Fungicides
Thioureas
Carbamates
Methyl esters